The 2009–10 Kuwaiti Premier League season was the 48th since its establishment.

Members clubs

Transfers 

Kuwaiti 2009 Summer transfers

Managerial changes

Final league standing

Relegation playoff

References 

 

Kuwait Premier League seasons
1
Kuw